Kiss Me with the Wind is the fifth studio album by the American singer/songwriter Brenda Russell, released in August 1990 on A&M Records. The album peaked at No. 25 on the UK Blues & Soul Top British Soul Albums chart.

Album history
After the success of her fourth album, Get Here (1988), Russell collaborated again with a variety of different producers and songwriters. Taking more of a dance-oriented slant than her previous album, Russell worked with the famed songwriter/producer Narada Michael Walden, who co-wrote and produced two tracks for the album with her, including the title track and "Stop Running Away", both of which were released as singles.

Also included on the album is Russell's own version of "Dinner with Gershwin", a track that Russell had written years earlier and given to Donna Summer who had a minor hit with it in 1987 (Russell had co-produced Summer's version with Richard Perry).

Track listing
 "Kiss Me with the Wind" (Brenda Russell, Narada Michael Walden) – 4:29
 "Stupid Love" (Brenda Russell) – 3:47
 "All American" (Brenda Russell, Sharon Robinson) – 4:16
 "Stop Running Away" (Brenda Russell, Narada Michael Walden) – 5:25
 "Waiting for You" (Brenda Russell) – 5:18
 "Justice in Truth" (Matthew Wilder, Brenda Russell) – 4:21
 "Dinner with Gershwin" (Brenda Russell) – 4:33
 "Good for Love" (Larry Williams, Brenda Russell) – 5:22
 "Night Train to Leningrad" (Brenda Russell) – 5:11
 "Drive My Car ('Til Sunset)" (Paul Chiten, Brenda Russell) – 4:50
 "On Your Side" (Brenda Russell) – 3:54

Personnel

Musicians 

 Brenda Russell – lead vocals, backing vocals (1, 2, 3, 5–8, 10, 11), arrangements (2, 5, 7, 8, 9, 11), synthesizers (2, 5, 7, 9, 11), synthesizer programming (2), drums (5, 7, 9, 11), drum programming (5, 7, 9, 11), percussion (9)
 Louis Biancaniello – rhythm arrangements (1), synthesizers (1), keyboards (1), rhythm programming (1), drum programming (1)
 Narada Michael Walden – rhythm arrangements (1), synth bass (1), percussion (1), acoustic piano (4), hi-hat (4), cymbal (4)
 Ren Klyce – Fairlight programming (1, 4)
 Don Boyett – synth bass (2), bass programming (2)
 Kurt Farquhar – synthesizer programming (2), synthesizer programming (2)
 Winston Johnson – Synclavier programming (2, 5, 7, 9, 10), special effects (9)
 Sharon Robinson – arrangements (3), synthesizers (3), drums (3), drum programming (3), backing vocals (3, 5, 10)
 Sam Ward – additional synthesizer sounds (3, 6, 11)
 Walter Afanasieff – keyboards (4), synthesizers (4), synth bass (4), drum programming (4)
 Eric Daniels – synth bass (4)
 Larry Williams – additional synthesizers (5, 9), arrangements (8), synthesizers (8), synthesizer programming (8), synth bass (8), sax solo (8)
 Matthew Wilder – arrangements (6), synthesizers (6), drums (6), drum programming (6)
 Greg Phillinganes – Rhodes piano (6), acoustic piano (7), synth bass (7)
 William "Smitty" Smith – organ (7)
 Paul Chiten – arrangements (10), synthesizers (10), drums (10), drum programming (10)
 Russell Ferrante – acoustic piano (11)
 Ray Obiedo – rhythm guitar (1)
 Don Griffin – guitars (2, 3)
 Dean Parks – lead guitar (3) 
 Earl Klugh – acoustic guitar (5, 10)
 Michael Thompson – guitars (8)
 Bill Sharpe – additional electric bass (8)
 Jimmy Haslip – bass (11) 
 Jeff Porcaro – drums (6, 11)
 John Robinson – drums (8)
 Paul Rekow – percussion (4)
 Lenny Castro – percussion (5, 10)
 Luis Conte – percussion (8)
 Aaron Zigman – additional percussion (8)
 Bill Reichenbach Jr. – euphonium (9)
 Ronald B. Cooper – cello (9)
 Andre Fischer – arrangements (2), rap (2)
 Philip Bailey – backing vocals (3)
 James Ingram – backing vocals (3)
 Phil Perry – backing vocals (3)
 Kitty Beethoven – backing vocals (4)
 Stephanie Spruill – backing vocals (3)
 Annie Stocking – backing vocals (4)
 Tina Thompson – backing vocals (4)
 Maxayn Lewis – backing vocals (5, 10)
 Petsye Powell – backing vocals (5, 10)
 The Sandra Crouch Singers – choir (11)

Production 
 Producers – Brenda Russell (Tracks 1–11); Narada Michael Walden (Tracks 1 & 4); Andre Fischer (Tracks 2, 3, 5, 6, 7, 9, 10 & 11); Larry Williams (Track 8).
 Executive Producers – Brenda Russell and Eric Borenstein
 Production Coordination – Frank DeCaro (Tracks 2, 3, 5, 6, 7, 9, 10 & 11); Erik Hanson (Track 8).
 Engineers – David Frazer (Tracks 1 & 4); Jeffrey Woodruff (Track 2); Mick Guzauski (Tracks 3, 6 & 11); Steve Sykes (Track 5); Richard McKernan (Tracks 7–10).
 Assistant Engineers – Dana Jon Chappelle and Marc Reyburn (Track 1 & 4); Ric Butz (Tracks 2 & 5); Steve Montgomery (Tracks 2, 5, 7 & 9); Scott Gordon (Tracks 3, 6 & 11); Mark Hagen (Tracks 3, 7, 9 & 11); Stacy Baird (Track 11).
 Additional Recording – Richard McKernan (Tracks 2 & 5); Steve Sykes (Track 2); Doug Rider (Track 5); Tony Phillipps, Larry Williams and Joe Wolpert (Track 8); Jeffrey Woodruff (Track 9).
 Mixing – David Frazer (Tracks 1 & 4); Jeffrey Woodruff (Track 2); Mick Guzauski (Tracks 3, 5, 6, 10 & 11); Brian Malouf (Track 7); Tommy Vicari (Track 8); Bill Schnee (Track 9).
 Mix Assistants – Richard McKernan (Tracks 3, 5, 6, 10 & 11); Scott Ralston (Track 7); Rob Harvey (Track 8); Ken Allerdyce (Track 9).
 Mastered by Mike Reese at The Mastering Lab (Los Angeles, CA).
 Art Direction – Chuck Beeson
 Design – Julie Osaki
 Photography – Vicki Pearson-Cameron
 Stylists – Fern Matia and Carmel Passanisi
 Make-up – Agostina

Charts

Singles

References

1990 albums
Brenda Russell albums
Albums produced by Narada Michael Walden
A&M Records albums